Elmo Savola (born 10 March 1995) is a Finnish athlete competing in the combined events. He won a bronze medal in the decathlon at the 2017 European U23 Championships.

International competitions

Personal bests
Outdoor
100 metres – 10.83 (+1.3 m/s, Götzis 2016)
400 metres – 48.84 (Kuortane 2017)
1500 metres – 4:39.50 (Bydgoszcz 2017)
110 metres hurdles – 14.21 (+1.7 m/s, Bydgoszcz 2017)
High jump – 1.99 (Pori 2015)
Pole vault – 4.80 (Berlin 2018)
Long jump – 7.29 (-0.6 m/s, Bydgoszcz 2017)
Shot put – 14.01 (Jyväskylä 2018)
Discus throw – 43.65 (Götzis 2016)
Javelin throw – 63.28 (Oulu 2016)
Decathlon – 7956 (Bydgoszcz 2017)
Indoor
60 metres – 7.07 (Kuortane 2018)
1000 metres – 2:50.93 (Jyväskylä 2018)
60 metres hurdles – 8.13 (Tampere 2016)
High jump – 2.02 (Kuortane 2016)
Pole vault – 4.67 (Tallinn 2017)
Long jump – 7.07 (Jyväskylä 2018)
Shot put – 14.08 (Jyväskylä 2018)
Heptathlon – 5639 (Jyväskylä 2018)

References

1995 births
Living people
Finnish decathletes
People from Lappajärvi
Finnish Athletics Championships winners
Sportspeople from South Ostrobothnia